= Vadym Olkhovych =

Ukrainian footballer

Personal information
- Full name: Vadym Serhiyovych Olkhovych
- Date of birth: 11 October 2002 (age 24)
- Place of birth: Lutsk, Ukraine
- Height: 1.75 m (5 ft 9 in)
- Position: Attacking midfielder

Team information
- Current team: Volyn Lutsk
- Number: 25

Youth career
- 2014–2016: Adrenalin Lutsk
- 2016–2019: Volyn Lutsk

Senior career*
Years	Team	Apps	(Gls)
2019–2022	Volyn Lutsk	1	(0)
2020–2021	→ Volyn-2 Lutsk	17	(0)
- * Club domestic league appearances and goals as of 24 September 2021

Vadym Serhiyovych Olkhovych (Ukrainian: Вадим Сергійович Ольхович; born 11 October 2002) is a Ukrainian professional footballer who plays as an attacking midfielder for Ukrainian club Volyn Lutsk.
